Zaporizhzhia Institute of Economics and Information Technologies (ZIEIT) is a private institute of higher education in the city of Zaporizhzhia, Ukraine, with branches in the cities of Melitopol and Kryvyi Rih. ZIEIT offers Bachelor's, Specialist's, and Master's degrees in various technical and economic specializations. ZIEIT is certified by the Ministry of Education of Ukraine.

History 
By Protocol №97 of July 13, 2012, the State Accreditation Commission of the Ministry of Education and Science, Youth and Sports of Ukraine recognized ZIEIT as accredited at the 4th (highest) level.

Specializations 
 Economic Cybernetics;
 Economics of a Firm;
 International Economics;
 Finance;
 Accounting and Audit;
 Taxation;
 Marketing;
 Management of Organizations;
 Computer Systems and Networks;
 Applied Mathematics;
 Translation;
 Industrial and Civil Construction;
 Building Constructions, Products and Materials Technology.

Subdivisions 
Mass media: The university publishes two periodicals - "Zarichna Street" and "Sports Street"

The institute also has separate divisions in Melitopol and Kryvyi Rih
Lyceum of Economics and Information Technology
 ZIEIT College
 Military Department

External links 
 Official ZIEIT site

Universities and colleges in Zaporizhzhia
Universities in Ukraine